Anti-Canadian sentiment is hostility towards the government, culture, or people of Canada.

Historical
Voltaire reputedly joked that Canada was "a few acres of snow." He was in fact referring to New France as it existed in the 18th century. The quote meant that New France was economically worthless and that France thus did not need to keep it. Many Canadians believe Voltaire's statement to be more an indictment of conquest in general.

Modern perceptions

United States

In the United States, Canada is often a target of conservative and right-wing commentators who hold the nation up as an example of what a government and society that are too liberal would look like.

"Soviet Canuckistan" (full name being The People's Republic of Soviet Canuckistan) is an epithet for Canada, used by Pat Buchanan on October 31, 2002, on his television show on MSNBC in which he denounced Canadians as anti-American and the country as a haven for terrorists. He was reacting to Canadian criticisms of US security measures regarding Arab Canadians.

Buchanan has a history of unflattering references to Canada, having said in 1990 that if Canada were to break apart due to the failure of the Meech Lake Accord, "America would pick up the pieces." He said two years after that "for most Americans, Canada is sort of like a case of latent arthritis. We really don't think about it, unless it acts up."

In 2005, the year in which Canada refused to participate in an American ballistic missile defense system and in which Paul Martin denounced American environmental policies, a new wave of "anti-Canadian" sentiment was reported. Media articles portraying Canada in a negative fashion increased substantially, appearing in newspapers such as the Weekly Standard, The New York Times, and the Wall Street Journal.

In a December 2005 interview, Tucker Carlson remarked on MSNBC that:First of all, anybody with any ambition at all, or intelligence, has left Canada and is now living in New York. Second, anybody who sides with Canada internationally in a debate between the U.S. and Canada, say, Belgium, is somebody whose opinion we shouldn't care about in the first place. Third, Canada is a sweet country. It is like your retarded cousin you see at Thanksgiving and sort of pat him on the head. You know, he's nice, but you don't take him seriously. That's Canada.

Saudi Arabia

Amid a diplomatic row between Saudi Arabia and Canada, there has been an apparent smear-campaign targeting Canada in Saudi media. An al-Arabiya segment accused Canada of human rights abuses.
(Saudi-owned al Arabiya broadcasts from Dubai.)
On August 6, 2018, a pro-government youth group uploaded a controversial photo which depicted an Air Canada airliner heading towards the CN Tower with the words "sticking ones nose where it doesn't belong". The account later deleted the Twitter post and apologized and the Ministry of Media of Saudi Arabia ordered the account @Infographic_KSA to shut down "until investigations are completed."

Islamic State 
The Islamic State's former spokesman, Abu Mohammad al-Adnani, has called for loyalists to the organization worldwide to murder the "Disbelievers" from those countries that took part in the International Action against ISIL, including Canada (which he singled out three times), which was responsible for Operation Impact.“If you kill a disbelieving American or European – especially the spiteful and filthy French – or an Australian, or a Canadian, or any other disbeliever from the disbelievers waging war, including the citizens of the countries that entered into a coalition against the Islamic State, then rely upon Allah, and kill him I any manner or way however it may be,”

-Abu Mohammad al-Adnani

Brazil

Anti-Canadian sentiment has been observed in Brazil. People boycotted Canadian goods to protest a Canadian ban of Brazilian beef imports, reportedly because of fears of mad-cow disease. A few Brazilians believed the Canadian ban was motivated by a trade dispute between the two nations. Canada's subsidies to aircraft manufacturer Bombardier and Brazil's subsidies to Bombardier's Brazilian rival Embraer have been a source of much tension because they are said to interfere with each other's business.

Canada
Some hostility towards or criticism of Canada as a nation can be seen within Canada itself, most prominently by Quebec nationalists and First Nations. Some First Nations refuse to celebrate Canada Day.

Quebec

Anti-Canadianism in the Francophone province of Quebec has its roots originally stemming from the resentment since the conquest of New France by Great Britain in 1760, even before the official existence as entities of Canada and Quebec themselves. However, after the Constitution Act, 1867, which officially made Canada a country on July 1, 1867, with four provinces: Ontario, Quebec, Nova Scotia, and New Brunswick, which marked the separate existence and de facto independence and de jure evolutionary independence of Canada, these sentiments developed into Anti-Canadianism. Anti-Canadianism is sometimes intertwined with Quebec nationalism.

From the invasion of New France in the 1760s and the formation of Canada in 1867 until the Quiet Revolution of the 1960s, the economy of Quebec and its high-ranking positions were controlled by the English speaking minority in Quebec, who were always a small minority comprising less than 10% throughout Quebec's post–Royal French Canadian history and who used to be mostly unilingual English speakers, despite the Francophone Québécois' comprising more than 80% of the province's population.  This led nationalist thinkers to denounce a colonial phenomenon that, as they believed, was at work between Quebec and the rest of Canada; some hold that residuals of this are still there in the present relationship.  Journalist Normand Lester published three volumes of The Black Book of English Canada detailing events of Canadian history he saw as being crimes perpetrated by the majority on the minority.

Quebec, whose sole official language is French since 1974, has introduced and implemented laws since the 1970s, especially with the adoption of the comprehensive Charter of the French Language Law in 1977 that limits the visibility of English on non-official signs. Commercial signs in languages other than French (especially targeting those in English) have been permitted only if French is given marked prominence in size. This law has been the subject of periodic controversy since its inception. While the architects and advocates of the Charter of the French Language Law argue that it was adopted to promote and protect the French language, critics argue that it is anti-English Canadian in its purpose by rooting out the English language from all spheres in Quebec.

One of the charter's articles stipulates that all children under 16 must receive their primary and secondary education in French schools, unless one of the child's parents has received most of their education in English, in Canada, or the child themselves has already received a substantial part of their education in English, in Canada. Access to elementary and secondary English language schools by non-anglophone immigrants have also been limited with this law.

Lucien Bouchard said that Canada wasn't a "real country", sparking outrage across Canada. He later apologized for the remark.

Newfoundland

Many in Newfoundland harbour an ambivalent attitude towards Canada. Many blame the federation for economic difficulties experienced since the dominion joined confederation in 1949. Some Newfoundlanders perceive a disrespectful attitude toward them from the rest of Canada, and Newfie stereotypes and ethnic jokes that depict Newfoundlanders as stupid or lazy are a source of ire. Former Newfoundland premier Danny Williams notably ordered all Canadian flags removed from provincial buildings during a dispute with the federal government in 2004. Williams was personally popular in Newfoundland, at times receiving as much as 85% support in polls.

Political accusations
Sometimes Canadians accuse each other of being anti-Canadian:  For example, Manitoba Premier Gary Doer (NDP) accused the governments of Ontario and Alberta of being "anti-Canadian" due to their dislike for equalization payments.

From the political right
Some anti-Canadian criticism from a few in the right of the political spectrum is coupled with proposals that the province of Alberta secede from the country to form a new nation, either on its own or with other Western provinces. A separatist party obtained more than one tenth of the vote in the 1982 Alberta general election although no other separatist party in Western Canada has obtained a similar share of the vote in a provincial election before or since 1982.

An example of conservative anti-Canadianism arose in 1997 when Stephen Harper, who was at the time vice-president of the conservative lobby group the National Citizens Coalition, stated he believed "Canada is a Northern European welfare state in the worst sense of the term, and very proud of it." The speech was made to members of the American conservative think tank the Council for National Policy. In the years since, claims have been made both that Harper's words were heartfelt, and that they were not, and that he was embellishing for the benefit of his audience. Harper himself dismissed the comments when they were cited by the centre-left Liberal Party in attack ads against him during the 2006 Canadian federal election, saying that they were meant as humour, not serious analysis. (Harper became prime minister of Canada in 2006.)

From the political left
Some communist organizations in Canada view a Canadian nationalist or isolationist line as revisionist, anti-communist and anti-internationalist. They believe the communist view of the national question in Canada should be internationalist and consider that other nationalities exist within the nation-state, such as the Québécois, First Nations and Acadian peoples; as well as the borders being artificial boundaries put in place during the colonial period and held in place under capitalism. These views are usually held by Maoist, Trotskyite and other revolutionary groups that tend not to participate in mainstream activities such as elections. Such alternative views can be viewed as anti-Canadianism by more nationalist tendencies on both the left and right.

Anti-Canadianism and humour
Humorous anti-Canadianism often focuses on broadly known attributes of Canada and Canadians such as cold weather or public health care, as the finer details of Canadian culture and politics are generally not well known outside Canada. The sport of curling is also treated with some irreverence in the United States and most of Europe. However, these broad targets are more accurately caricatured within Canada itself. The fact that others are perceived to know surprisingly little about Canada is a frequent theme in Canadian humour and such examples of self-deprecating humour are nearly universal among Canadian humorists. In keeping with this attitude, some genuinely critical anti-Canadianisms such as "Soviet Canuckistan" are embraced by some Canadians as humorous, in defiance of the original intent. A more modern example of anti-Canadianism is the website “Stop Canada” which rose to popularity in 2022.

See also
Canadian values
Wexit
I Am Canadian
 War Plan Red

References

 
Canadianism, Anti-
Canada in popular culture
Canada–United States relations